Perumthachan (പെരുന്തച്ചന്‍), also spelled as "Perunthchan" (പെരു - Peru/big, തച്ചന്‍ - thachan/craftsman), meaning the master carpenter or the master craftsman, is an honorific title that is used to refer to an ancient legendary carpenter (ആശാരി Aashari), architect, woodcarver and sculptor (stone/wood) from Kerala, India. However Perumthachan is an important figure in the folklore of Kerala and many a wondrous structure and architecture that still stand are attributed to him.

History and legend

Birth and related legends 
Many legends of Perumthachan are seen in Aithihyamala, the compilation of legends and folklore of Kerala written by Kottarathil Sankunni. Given that Perumthachan was a Vishwakarma his parents must also have been Carpenter.  After their marriage, they set out on a long journey. Each of them grew famous in their lives and many tales and lores were attributed, with them as the main cast. The eldest was Agnihothri, a Brahmin, whose place is Mezhathur in Thrithala. The others are Perumthachan (Master carpenter), Naranath Bhranthan (an eccentric philosopher who was perceived as a madman), Vayillakunnilappan (a child with no mouth, whom the mother wanted to keep with her) and so on.

Since Raman (രാമന്‍) was raised by parents who belonged to the Thachan, he mastered the art and science of carpentry, architecture, and sculpture to become a Perumthachan. He read the sacred texts and imbibed the ancient intellectual tradition. He was commissioned for many a great architectural project to build temples and palaces.

Legend of Temple Pond
Perumthachan was once assigned to construct a temple pond. But it so happened that a dispute arose among three Karakkars (local residents) of the place as to the shape of the pond to be constructed. One group wanted a rectangular pond, another a square pond and the third, a circular shape. Perumthachan agreed to construct a pond which would satisfy all the three conflicting demands. When the pond was constructed, the Karakkars from each of the sides were immensely pleased to see their desired shape for the pond. It was so because the original shape of the pond was none of these three but a highly irregular shape, which could create an illusion and fool the onlooker from each side.

The Shiva temple at Uliyannoor and the Valluvanad temples that still exist in Kerala are attributed to Perumthachan.

Panniyur Sri Varahamurthy Temple, situated in Palakkad district, Kerala preserve the chisel and measuring rod (muzhakkol) used by perumthachan.

Influence on art and culture 

The story of Perumthachan has been a source of artistic expression for various people. It has been the basis for a great Malayalam dramatic monologue poem of the same name by G. Sankara Kurup. The legend of Perumthachan was also depicted in the 1991 Malayalam film Perumthachan masterfully performed by the acclaimed actor Thilakan. The movie script was written by M. T. Vasudevan Nair and directed by Ajayan and has won many prestigious accolades for its brilliant cinematography and direction.

See also
Parayi petta panthirukulam

References

External links
    Details of Thachan caste
 Perumthachan on IMDb
 Article on the film 'Perumthachan'
 Aithihyamala-Perumthachan
 Pakkanar
 Chengannur Mahadeva Temple

Culture of Kerala
History of Kerala
Malayali people